Ben Baker is an Australian and American portrait photographer based in New York City. He is well known for Iconic portraits of the world's most powerful people, most notably Presidents, Clinton, Bush, Obama, and Trump.

Early life

Ben was born in Adelaide, Australia. His father David was a mediator working in remote Aboriginal communities and later serving as an advisor to the South Australian Premier's cabinet. His mother Rochelle was a community health worker focused on delivering social programs to women in need.

They are both currently professors at the University of South Australia.

While growing up in Darwin and remote parts of the Northern Territory Ben travelled with his father as he met with aboriginal communities.

Ben graduated from Christian Brothers College, Adelaide and applied to the local TAFE community college photography program where he was rejected.

Career

After being rejected by his local community college he began working as a photo assistant at studio 9D working on international wine campaigns. He moved to Sydney, where he began working for award-winning photographer Simon Harsent. They worked together on award-winning national and international advertising campaigns.

Deciding travel was next on the list he travelled extensively through South America and living in Bolivia for a short while.

On his way to an assisting in the UK Ben stopped by New York City where he was offered a position as an assistant to the legendary Annie Leibovitz. His first project with Annie and Vanity Fair magazine was the 1998 Hollywood cover with Cate Blanchett, Joaquin Phoenix, Vince Vaughn, Toby Maguire, Natalie Portman, Christina Ricci and others.

After time with Leibovitz, he went to on to assist legendary photographers Mary Ellen Mark, Harry Benson and Mark Seliger and Martin Schoeller on projects for Rolling Stone, The New Yorker, Time, and Life magazines.

His shooting career began with assignments from New York Magazine, Newsweek, Esquire and Time. He then went on to shooting projects for Fortune, AARP, Forbes and Oprah Magazine amongst many others.

His most notable subjects to date have been, President Barack Obama, President Donald Trump, President Bush, President Bill Clinton, Vice President Joe Biden, First Lady Michelle Obama, Warren Buffett, Michael Bloomberg, Oprah Winfrey  Tony Bennett, Lady Gaga, Ralph Lauren, Jay -Z, Rupert Murdoch, Hosni Mubarak of Pakistan, Mahmoud Ahmadinejad of Iran,  Hamid Karzi of Afghanistan.

He has shot advertising campaigns for MasterCard, IBM, Goldman Sachs, JP Morgan, Bloomberg, USAA and Charles Schwab.

Awards and collections

His work has been collected by the National Portrait Gallery of Australia and the African American Museum of History and Culture in Washington DC. His recently exhibited at the National Geographic Museum in Washington D.C. His work has won awards with the American Photography collections, New York Press clubs and Photo District News.

References

Australian photographers
Photographers from Adelaide
Living people
Year of birth missing (living people)